Catasetum barbatum, the bearded catasetum, is a species of orchid. It occurs commonly in Amazonas and Central Brazil. It is found in a wide variety of open, lowlands habitats, mostly riparian. It is unique in having male, female, and hermaphroditic flowers, pollinated by male euglossine bees.

References

barbatum